Chanter is a surname. Notable people with the surname include:

The Chanter Sisters, duo of British singers comprising Irene Chanter and Doreen Chanter
Charlotte Chanter (1828-1882), British author
Doreen Chanter, British singer, one of the Chanter Sisters
John Chanter, Australian politician
Vic Chanter, Australian rules footballer

See also
Hugh the Chanter, an alternative name for Hugh Sottovagina, twelfth century historian
John the Chanter, medieval Bishop of Exeter